The FAME Awards may refer to:

 The Fans of Adult Media and Entertainment Award
 The Film, Art, Music, and Entertainment Awards, an awards program of the LA Music Awards